Sarab Abu-Rabia-Queder (born September 5, 1976) is an Israeli-Arab sociologist, anthropologist, and feminist activist with a specialty in gender studies. She is the first Bedouin woman in Israel to receive a doctorate, and to be promoted to Associate Professor. In June 2021, she was appointed Vice-President for Diversity and Inclusion at Ben-Gurion University of the Negev

Early life and education
Sarab Abu-Rabia was born in Beersheba, September 5, 1976. She is the eldest daughter of Abu Yunis, the first Bedouin doctor in the country, a resident of the tribe of Abu Rabia, the largest and most well-known in the Negev. Her mother is from northern Israel. Abu Rabia has three sisters and a brother.

She studied at the Comprehensive High School in Beersheba, one of the better-funded Jewish schools in the city, and was the only Bedouin among 400 Jewish students. She received a Ph.D. from Ben-Gurion University of the Negev in 2006, and carried out postdoctoral fellowship in Gender Studies at the Hebrew University of Jerusalem and University of Oxford in England.

Research and career
Abu-Rabia-Queder has been described in a literature review of Palestinian anthropology as "a pioneer of scholarship on the economies of Palestinian Bedouin women in Israel." She is an Associate Professor in the School of Education at Ben-Gurion University of the Negev.

She teaches Arab feminism in the Middle East, on Diversity and racism in the academic world. Her research includes education and employment among minority populations. She has published three books on the subject. A feminist activist and activist for the rights of Bedouin society in the Negev, she is one of the founders of the Forum of Arab Women's Organizations in the Negev. She serves as book review editor of Hagar Journal: Studies in Culture, Polity and Identities. Abu-Rabia-Queder's approach relies on postcolonial critiqe. Her areas of expertise and research include:

Sociology of education, employment and gender in the mirror of postcolonial theory inequality
Marginalization among indigenous minorities, particularly Palestinian society, Bedouin society, and Ethiopian women
Native feminism and epistemic justice

Personal life
She married Hassan Abu Qweider, an accountant, and is the mother of three sons. Abu-Rabia-Queder lives in Be'er Sheva.

Awards and honors
2007-2008 - Breslauer Family, N.Y
2007-2008 - Pears Family Foundation, London, UK
2007-2008 - The Association for Promoting Bedouin Women s Education in the Negev, Israel
2005-2006 - University Women s Association in Israel, for the paper Women in Israeli Society

Selected works
Motivated and Loved: Stories of the Lives of Bedouin Educated Women, Magnes Press, The Hebrew University (2008)
Palestinian Women in Israel: Identity, Power Relations and Coping, Hakibbutz Hame'uchad Publishing House and the Van Leer Jerusalem Institute (with Naomi Weiner-Levy, 2010)
Class Identity in the Making: Prophylactic Philosophies in the Negev, Magnes Press, The Hebrew University (2017)

In scientific journals
Abu-Rabia-Queder, Sarab (2006). Between tradition and modernization: Understanding the problem of Bedouin female dropout, British Journal of Sociology of Education, 27 (1), 3-17
Abu-Rabia-Queder, Sarab (2007). Permission to rebel: Arab Bedouin women changing negotiation of social roles, Feminist Studies, 33 (1), 161-187
Abu-Rabia-Queder, Sarab (2007). Coping with "forbidden love" and forlessess marriage: Educated Bedouin women from the Negev, Ethnography, 8 (3), 297-323
Abu-Rabia-Queder, Sarab (2007). The activism of Bedouin women: Social and political resistance, HAGAR: Studies in Culture, Policy and Identities, 7 (2), 67-84
Abu-Rabia-Queder, Sarab (2008). Politics of conformity: Power for creating change, Ethnology: An International Journal of Cultural and Social Anthropology, 47 (4), 209-225
Abu-Rabia-Queder, Sarab & Weiner-Levi, Naomi (2008). Identity and gender in cultural transitions: Returning home from higher education as "internal immigrants" among Bedouin and Druze women in Israel, Social Identities: Journal for the Study of Race, Nation and Culture, 14 (6), 665-682
Abu-Rabia-Queder, Sarab (2008). Does education necessarily mean enlightenment? The case of Palestinian Bedouin women in Israel, Anthropology and Education Quarterly, 39 (4), 381-400
Abu-Rabia-Queder, Sarab & Oplatka, Izhar (2008). The power of femininity among female leadership in Bedouin society: Exploring the gender and ethnic experiences of Muslim women who accessed the supervisor, Journal of Educational Administration, 46 (3), 396-415
Abu-Rabia-Queder, Sarab (2008). "Management and Gender in Bedouin Society" Gender and management in Bedouin society, Megamot, 45 (3), 489-509 (Hebrew)
Abu-Rabia-Queder, Sarab (2011). Higher education as a platform for cultural transition: The case of the first educated Bedouin women in Israel, Higher Education Quarterly, 65 (2), 186-205
Abu-Rabia-Queder, Sarab & Arar, Khaled (2011). Gender and higher education in different national spaces: Palestinian women studying in Israeli and Jordanian universities, Journal: International and Comparative Education, 41 (3), 1-18
Arar, Khaled & Abu-Rabia-Queder, Sarab (2011). Turning points in the lives of two pioneer Arab women principals in Israel, Gender & Education, 23 (4), 415-429
Abu-Rabia-Queder, Sarab & Karplus, Yuval (2012). Regendering space and reconstruction identity: Bedouin women's translocal mobility into Israeli-Jewish institutions of higher education, Gender, Place and Culture; A Journal of Feminist Geography, 1-17.
Weiner-Levi, Naomi & Abu-Rabia-Queder, Sarab (2012). Researching my people, researching the "other": Field experiences of two researchers along shifting positions, Quality and Quantity: International Journal of Methodology, 46 (4), 1151-1165
Abu-Rabia-Queder, Sarab (2014). "Our problem is two problems: That you're a woman and that you're educated": Gendering and racializing Bedouin women experience at Israeli universities. International Journal of Educational Development 35: 44-52
Abu-Rabia-Queder, Sarab & Weiner-Levy, Naomi (2013). Between local and foreign structures: Exploring the agency of Palestinian women in Israel, Social Politics: International Studies in Gender, State & Society, 20 (1): 88 -108

References

Bibliography
 

1976 births
Living people
Israeli sociologists
Israeli women sociologists
Israeli women anthropologists
Israeli feminists
Gender studies academics
Bedouin Israelis
Ben-Gurion University of the Negev alumni
Hebrew University of Jerusalem Faculty of Social Sciences alumni
Alumni of the University of Oxford
Academic staff of Ben-Gurion University of the Negev
21st-century non-fiction writers
21st-century Israeli writers
21st-century Israeli women writers